The third competition weekend of the 2014–15 ISU Speed Skating World Cup will be held in Sportforum Hohenschönhausen in Berlin, Germany, from Friday, 5 December, until Sunday, 7 December 2014.

Artur Waś of Poland both men's 500 m races. In the women's competitions, Ireen Wüst of the Netherlands won three gold medals; in the 1500 m and 3000 m races, as well as in the team pursuit. Lee Sang-hwa of South Korea won both 500 m races. Heather Richardson of the United States managed to take no less than four silver medals; in both 500 m races, as well as the 1000 m and 1500 m races.

No world records were set during the weekend, but Christian Oberbichler of Switzerland set a new national record on in the B division of the men's 500 m on Friday, and both Marina Zueva of Belarus and Saskia Alusalu of Estonia set new national records in the B division of the women's 3000 m, also on Friday.

Schedule
The detailed schedule of events:

All times are CET (UTC+1).

Medal summary

Men's events

 In mass start, race points are accumulated during the race. The skater with most race points is the winner.

Women's events

 In mass start, race points are accumulated during the race. The skater with most race points is the winner.

References

 
3
Isu World Cup, 2014-15, 3
Speed skating in Berlin
2014 in Berlin